Fernbank Museum of Natural History, in Atlanta, Georgia, is a museum that presents exhibitions and programming about natural history. Fernbank Museum has a number of permanent exhibitions and regularly hosts temporary exhibitions in its expansive facility, designed by Graham Gund Architects. The permanent exhibition, A Walk Through Time in Georgia, tells the twofold story of Georgia's natural history and the development of the planet. Fernbank Museum has won several national and international awards for one of its newest permanent exhibitions, Fernbank NatureQuest, an immersive, interactive exhibition for children that was designed and produced by Thinkwell Group. The awards NatureQuest has won include the 2012 Thea Award for Outstanding Achievement for a Museum Exhibit and the 2011 Bronze Award for Best Museum Environment from Event Design. The nearby Fernbank Science Center is a separate organization operated by the DeKalb County Board of Education and is not affiliated with Fernbank Museum of Natural History (Fernbank, Inc.).

History
In the late 1800s, a nature-lover named Emily Harrison grew up in an area east of Atlanta which she called "Fernbank". In 1964, the Fernbank trustees and the DeKalb County School System created Fernbank Science Center, which led to a desire to share Fernbank's resources with the general public.

Following master planning and designs by the Cambridge, Massachusetts-based architectural firm, Graham Gund Architects, ground was broken in 1989, and on October 5, 1992, Fernbank Museum of Natural History opened to the public. The new building is carefully located behind a row of historic houses, and features a glass-enclosed atrium overlooking Fernbank Forest.

Exhibits 
Fernbank Museum offers a variety of exhibits exploring many different natural history topics. Exhibits include:
 Fernbank NatureQuest
 Dinosaur Plaza
 Giants of the Mesozoic
 A Walk Through Time in Georgia
 Reflections of Culture
 Conveyed in Clay: Stories from St. Catherines Island
 Curator's Corner
 World of Shells
Fantastic Forces
The museum also has an area where special exhibitions are cycled through. These exhibits tend to stay open to the public for 2–4 months each.

Outdoor exhibits 
In 2016, the museum opened WildWoods, an accessible 10-acre area located directly behind the museum with trails and interactive exhibits. In 2016 Fernbank also opened access to the newly restored, 65-acre Fernbank Forest.

Giant screen theatre
Fernbank is home to the Rankin M. Smith, Sr. Giant Screen Theater. Formerly an IMAX theater, upgrades were completed in February 2017 including a digital 4K 3D laser-illuminated projection system.

Special programming
Fernbank puts on special activities for adults and children including summer camps, lectures, workshops, interactive conversations, family activity days, and storytelling.

One of Fernbank's most popular events, Fernbank After Dark runs the second Friday of each month, January through November, and features movies in the giant screen theater, drinks, food and live music.

F.U.N Volunteer Program 
Fernbank Museum of Natural History offers a year-round volunteer program for children aged 13–17. F.U.N. (Fernbank UItimate Naturalist) Volunteers interact with museum guests while working on educational carts throughout the museum, exploring a wide range of natural history topics, including Archaeology, Paleontology, Anatomy, and more.

See also
 Fernbank Forest
 Fernbank Science Center
 List of natural history museums

References

External links

 Fernbank Museum of Natural History

Institutions accredited by the American Alliance of Museums
Museums in Atlanta
Natural history museums in Georgia (U.S. state)
Museums in DeKalb County, Georgia
Druid Hills, Georgia
Dinosaur museums in the United States
Paleontology in Georgia (U.S. state)